Dynamic spectrum management (DSM), also referred to as dynamic spectrum access (DSA), is a set of techniques based on theoretical concepts in network information theory and game theory that is being researched and developed to improve the performance of a communication network as a whole. The concept of DSM also draws principles from the fields of cross-layer optimization, artificial intelligence, machine learning etc. It has been recently made possible by the availability of software radio due to development of fast enough processors both at servers and at terminals. These are techniques for cooperative optimization. This can also be compared or related to optimization of one link in the network on the account of losing performance on many links negatively affected by this single optimization. 

It is most commonly applied to optimize digital subscriber line (DSL) performance of a network.  Another potential application of DSM is for cognitive radio. 

Important and common principles of DSM include:
 Link adaptation
 Bandwidth management
 Multi-user MIMO
 Pre-cancellation of estimated interference
 Combining unused channels (not pre-allocated) for a single user or bonding

DSM in Digital Subscribers Loop
DSM can be achieved over ordinary copper phone lines' network by reducing or eliminating crosstalk, interference and near–far problem within a DSL network especially affecting the DSL phone lines that are close together in a binder.

The technique involves multiple methods:
 Continuously monitoring the status of interfering signal levels using current bit-loading compared to maximum achievable bit rate, number of errored seconds, number of severely errored seconds, number of forward error corrections (FEC) and making decisions about the underperforming scenario's cause and forcing the link to train in a specific way.
 Identifying the neighborhood cables in the binders that may be causing unwanted cross-talk and lowering their upstream transmission power until bit-rates are optimized for the network.
 Increasing or decreasing the amount of forward error correction overhead applied to the signal propagating on the cable in response to the severity of the correlated interferers or jammers.
 Modifying the limits on the power levels allowed on cable, the masks of the tones on which bits can be loaded or the masks for power spectral density to allow for minimization of the interference caused due to excess signal-to-noise ratio (SNR) causing degradation of SNR on other lines. 
 Modem hardware (consumer premises equipment) adjusting transmission settings in order to achieve the optimized discrete multitone modulation (DMT) signal (this is not exactly DSM and can be achieved even without DSM). This hardware adjustment being forced from a central monitoring location and applied to a network of consumer premises equipment, on the whole, to optimize the network performance as a whole.

See also
 Interruptible spectrum

References

External links
 Boost for Internet speeds without fibre-optics
 ECI Telecom sets out to double DSL speed
 DSM project — Prof. John Cioffi
 Fast Copper Project — Princeton University
 Dynamic Spectrum Management Publications — Raphael Cendrillon

Digital subscriber line
Telecommunication protocols
Management cybernetics